John Wharton may refer to:

Politicians
John Wharton (fl. 1407–1420), MP for Guildford
John Wharton (MP for Beverley) (1765–1843)
John Lloyd Wharton (1837–1912), British Member of Parliament for Durham, 1871–1874, and Ripon, 1886–1906

Others
John Austin Wharton (1806–1838), soldier and statesman in the Republic of Texas
John A. Wharton (1828–1865), lawyer, planter, and Confederate general during the American Civil War
John F. Wharton (lawyer) (1894–1977), American lawyer and founding partner of Paul, Weiss, Rifkind, Wharton & Garrison LLP
John F. Wharton (general) (born c. 1957), U.S. Army major general and career logistics officer
John Harrison Wharton (1954–2018), American engineer specializing in microprocessors